The 2013–2014 Israeli Basketball Super League (Also known as Ligat Loto) was the 60th season of the Israeli Basketball Super League. The season began on 13 October 2013 and ended on 11 June 2014.

Teams Information

Team Changes 

Ironi Ashkelon has been relegated as they finished in the bottom spot last season.
Ironi Nes Ziona has been promoted to the league after winning Ligat Leumit last season.

Stadia and locations

Head coaches

Regular season

Pld – Played; W – Won; L – Lost; PF – Points for; PA – Points against; Diff – Difference; Pts – Points.

Bracket
The Finals series was played in a home-and-away format, with the overall cumulative score determining the champion.

Quarterfinals

The Quarterfinals are played as The-Best-Of-5 series. The higher ranked team hosts games 1, 3 and 5 (if necessary). The lower ranked team hosts games 2 and 4 (if necessary).

Semifinals

The Semifinals are played as The-Best-Of-5 series. The higher ranked team hosts games 1, 3 and 5 (if necessary). The lower ranked team hosts games 2 and 4 (if necessary).

Finals
The Finals series is played in a home-and-away format, with the overall cumulative score determining the champion. Thus, the score of one single game can be tied.
The team who finishes at a higher place in the regular season will host the second game.

Game 1

Game 2

Average home attendances

Individual statistics

Rating

Points

Rebounds

Assists

All-Star Game
The 2014 Israeli League All-star event was held on February 25, 2014, at the Conch Arena, Beer-Sheva.

Three-point shootout

Slam Dunk Contest

Awards

Regular season MVP

 Donta Smith (Maccabi Haifa)

All-BSL 1st team
 Raviv Limonad (Hapoel Tel Aviv)
 Kevin Palmer (Hapoel Eilat)
 Donta Smith (Maccabi Haifa)
 Josh Duncan (Hapoel Jerusalem)
 Alex Tyus (Maccabi Tel Aviv)

Coach of the season
 David Blatt (Maccabi Tel Aviv)

Co-Rising star
 Aviram Zelekovits (Bnei Herzliya)
 Oz Blayzer (Bnei Herzliya)

Best Defender
 Brian Randle (Maccabi Haifa)

Most Improved Player
 Shawn Dawson (Maccabi Rishon LeZion)

Sixth Man of the Season
 David Blu (Maccabi Tel Aviv)

Monthly Awards

References

External links
IBA's official website (Hebrew)

Israeli Basketball Premier League seasons
Israeli
Basketball